"Esse Cara Sou Eu" is a song by Brazilian recording artist Roberto Carlos. was released on November 4, 2012 as the first single from extended play (EP) Esse Cara Sou Eu, with the record labels Amigos Records and Sony Music. The song was produced by Guto Graça Mello and Dody Sirena. The track were included on the soundtrack of the Rede Globo's telenovela Salve Jorge  in 2012. "Ese Tipo Soy Yo" is the Spanish-language version of the song released for the Hispanophone market.

Music video 
On October 19, 2012 Carlos uploaded the Lyric video for "Esse Cara Sou Eu" on his YouTube and Vevo account.

Commercial performance 
"Esse Cara Sou Eu" debut for the Brasil Hot 100 Airplay entering the chart at number 8. Its chart debut was supported by first-week digital download sales of 500,000 copies.

Track listing 
Download digital
Esse Cara Sou Eu — 4:32

Charts

Weekly charts

See also
 List of Hot 100 number-one singles of 2012 (Brazil)
 List of Hot 100 number-one singles of 2013 (Brazil)

References

2012 songs
Roberto Carlos (singer) songs
Portuguese-language songs
2012 singles
Latin Grammy Award for Best Portuguese Language Song